The small village of Ashton is located about  southwest of Downtown Ottawa, Ontario, at the intersection of Ashton Station Road and Flewellyn Road. Ashton Station Road runs through the centre of the community, and serves as the south-western boundary line for the City of Ottawa, thus making the eastern portion of the hamlet part of Ottawa, and the western portion part of Lanark County. The eastern portion of the community was originally part of Goulbourn Township, which was amalgamated into the City of Ottawa in 2001. It is home to approximately 200 residents.

The headwaters of the Jock River, which runs through the heart of the community, are just to the west of the hamlet. There is a general store, a pub, several churches and a community center. Unlike many communities surrounding the burgeoning city of Ottawa, Ashton has remained relatively unchanged for many years. Public high school students in this area go to South Carleton High School in Richmond.

Movies filmed in Ashton: The Day

History
The village was first laid out by John Sumner, general merchant and postmaster, on the Goodwood river; however, the first Euro-Canadian settler was William McFadden, who came in 1817.  By 1866–7, it was in the township of Goulbourne, close to the dividing line between the counties of Carleton and Lanark.
It had a population of about 100, and contained two churches-Presbyterian, a stone edifice; and Church of England, also stone; and one common school, with an average attendance of about 40 pupils.

Originally the community was called Sumner's Corners and then Mount Pleasant. However, that name was duplicated elsewhere in the province, so it was renamed in 1851 for Ashton-under-Lyne, a suburb of Manchester, England.

References

External links

 Ashton Community Association

Neighbourhoods in Ottawa